Alpine Energy Stadium, originally called Fraser Park, is a sports stadium in Timaru, New Zealand. It is currently used mostly for rugby union matches. The stadium is able to hold 12,000 people or 12,500 with temporary seating.

History
The ground was originally called Fraser Park, and was renamed Alpine Energy Stadium in 1995. That same year, overhead floodlights were installed for night games at the park.

Tenants 
The stadium is the home ground of the South Canterbury Rugby Team, who play in the Heartland Championship.

Stadium 
The stadium had two main stands until April 2016 the east stand was closed permanently due to damage. Otherwise, the stadium is surrounded by embankment.

Temporary site for games from Christchurch
In the wake of the February 2011 Christchurch earthquake, the Christchurch Super Rugby team, the Crusaders, moved two Super 15 seasonal games (versus the Bulls and the Blues) to Alpine Energy Stadium.

References 

Rugby union stadiums in New Zealand
Sport in Timaru
Multi-purpose stadiums in New Zealand
Sports venues in Canterbury, New Zealand